Washington House may refer to:

Legislature
 Washington House of Representatives, legislative body of Washington State

Places
Washington-Wilkes Historical Museum, Washington, Georgia, on the National Register of Historic Places (NRHP)
William B. and Julia Washington House, Leoti, Kansas, on the NRHP
George Washington House (Bladensburg, Maryland)
Washingtonian Hall, Endwell, New York
Bill Washington Ranchhouse, Marietta, Oklahoma, listed on the NRHP in Love County, Oklahoma
 Heyward-Washington House, Charleston, South Carolina, NRHP-listed
William Washington House, an 18th-century house in Charleston, South Carolina
George Washington Boyhood Home Site, Fredericksburg, Virginia
Mary Washington House, Fredericksburg, Virginia
Colonel Lewis William Washington House, Halltown, West Virginia, NRHP-listed
Charles Washington House, Charles Town, West Virginia

See also
Mount Vernon
Washington's Headquarters (disambiguation)
George Washington House (disambiguation)
Washington Hall (disambiguation)
Washington Hotel (disambiguation)

Architectural disambiguation pages